The Amateur National Championship (or National) is the third division of the Moroccan Football League, behind the Botola and the Botola 2. Before 2004 the league was called Rabita Football Amateur 1.

History 
Before 2004, this division was named Rabita Football Amateur 1, then Groupement National de Football Amateurs 1 until the creation of the National League of Amateur Football in 2015.
Starting from the season 2017/2018, the division take the name of Amateur National Championship or National and was reorganized on one unique group of 16 teams.

Promotion and relegation 
The champions and vice-champions are promoted to the next league.

Teams for 2018–2019 
 COD Meknès
 Chabab Houara
 Chabab Mohammédia
 Tihad Athletic Sport
 FR Nador
 AAS Ouislane
 Rachad Bernoussi
 Stade Marocain
 EJS Casablanca
 CSM Ouarzazate
 Chabab M'rirt
 OC Youssoufia
 WR Fes
 US Témara
 USM Oujda
 Mouloudia Dakhla

Winners

Before 2007

From 2008 to 2009

From 2010 to 2017

Since 2018 
Since 2018, one unique group was created with 16 teams.

References

External links
 Officiel website of the Federation Royale Marocaine de Football
 Official website of the LNFA
 National on SofaScore

Football leagues in Morocco